Zukey Lake is a small lake in Livingston County, Michigan.

See also
List of lakes in Michigan

References

Lakes of Michigan
Lakes of Livingston County, Michigan
Huron River (Michigan)